Vladimir A. Kossogovsky (14 January 1857 – 12 September 1918) was a Russian Lieutenant-General, commander of the Persian Cossack Brigade, and a member of the General Staff of the Imperial Russian Army.

Biography
Kossogovsky was educated at the first Moscow military school, the St. Nicholas Cavalry. After attending, he enlisted in the 12th Hussars Regiment Akhtyrsky (1876). According to the General Staff service record, he later became a senior of the al-T Staff 2nd Caucasus Cossack division. In May 1884, he became the new commander of the Persian Cossack Brigade. He also served in the Russo-Turkish War (1877–78) and the Russo-Japanese War.

In 1908, he retired to his estate, Pogostiha, in Novgorod Governorate. Kossogovsky was shot by the Bolsheviks there on 12 September 1918.

Name 
His surname can be written as Kosogovsky, Kosagovsky, Kosagovsky, Kosogovsky.

Selected bibliography
Published works;

 From the diary as a Colonel Tehran VA Kosogovskogo. Moscow, 1960 (fragments)
 Persia in the late XIX century // New East. 1923. № 3 (fragment)
 Essay on the development of the Persian Cossack Brigade // New East. 1923. № 4

Unpublished works;

 The armed forces of Persia // RGVIA, f. 76, op. 1, d. 378 (503 pp.)
 History of the Persian Cossack Brigade // RGVIA, f. 76, op. 1, d. 217 (315 pp.)
 Articles about Persia // RGVIA, f. 76, op. 1, d. 371 (130 pp.)
 Memories // RGVIA, f. 76, op. 1, d. 591 (128 pp.)
 Blog // Archive of orientalists of the Institute of Oriental Manuscripts, p. 30 VA Kosagovsky

References

Sources
 Послужной список генерал-майора Косаговского В. А., РГВИА, ф. 409, оп. 1, д. 317-686 (1906 г.) (in Russian)
 Личный фонд Косаговского В. А. РГВИА, ф. 76, 591 ед. хр., 1820—1921 гг., оп. 1. (in Russian)
 Личный фонд Косаговского В. А. Архив востоковедов ИВР РАН, ф. 30. (in Russian)
 Список генералам по старшинству на 1903 год. СПб., 1903. (in Russian)
 Шитов Г. В. Персия под властью последних Каджаров. Л., 1933. (in Russian)
 Петров Г. М. Из архива Косаговского [Сведения об убийстве в Тегеране Российского Императорского чрезвычайного посланника и полномочного министра при дворе персидском Грибоедова]. — Ученые записки Института востоковедения. Т. VIII. М., изд. АН СССР, 1953, с. 156—162. (in Russian)
 Петров Г. М. Предисловие // Из тегеранского дневника полковника В. А. Косоговского. М., 1960. (in Russian)
 Басханов М. К. Русские военные востоковеды до 1917 года. Биобиблиографический словарь. М., Восточная литература, 2005, с. 126—127.
 Красняк О. А. Становление иранской регулярной армии в 1879—1921 гг. М., 2007. (in Russian)

1857 births
1918 deaths
Russian military personnel of the Russo-Turkish War (1877–1878)
Russian people of the Russo-Japanese War
Recipients of the Order of St. Anna
Russian orientalists
Emigrants from the Russian Empire to Iran